Carolee is a feminine given name. Notable people with the name include:

Carolee Carmello (born 1962), American actress
Carolee Schneemann (1939–2019), American visual artist

See also

Carolle
Caralee
Carole

Feminine given names